Khola Amjad (born 12 December 1952) is a Pakistani politician who was a Member of the Provincial Assembly of the Punjab, from May 2013 to May 2018.

Early life and education
She was born on 12 December 1952 in Multan.

She earned Master Diploma in French from Alliance Française in 1976. She completed postgraduate diploma in Office Management from Bahauddin Zakariya University in 2000.

Political career

She was elected to the Provincial Assembly of the Punjab as a candidate of Pakistan Muslim League (N) on a reserved seat for women in 2013 Pakistani general election.

References

Living people
Punjab MPAs 2013–2018
1952 births
Pakistan Muslim League (N) politicians